Bhartruhari Mahtab (born 8 September 1957) is an Indian politician, the son of Late Shri Dr. Harekrushna Mahatab. He is a member of the Biju Janata Dal (BJD) political party. He was elected to the 12th Lok Sabha in 1998 from Cuttack constituency in Odisha. He was re-elected to the Lok Sabha in 1999, 2004, 2009, 2014 and 2019 from the same constituency. He received the Outstanding Parliamentarian Award 2017. He is also the recipient of Sansad Ratna Award 2017, 2018, 2019 and 2020 for his outstanding performance in 'Debates'.

See also
 Indian general election, 2014 (Odisha)

References

External links
Profile on Loksabha site 

1957 births
Living people
Lok Sabha members from Odisha
India MPs 1998–1999
India MPs 1999–2004
India MPs 2004–2009
India MPs 2009–2014
India MPs 2014–2019
Biju Janata Dal politicians
People from Cuttack district
People from Bhadrak district
India MPs 2019–present